Haysville is a city in Sedgwick County, Kansas, United States, and a suburb of Wichita.  As of the 2020 census, the population of the city was 11,262.  Haysville is known as the "Peach Capital of Kansas".

History

W.W. Hays came to this area in the early 1870s.  In 1891, he platted land that he owned so a town could be built.
The Haysville State Bank was established in 1919. Truck farming supported a lot of the families in the area. In 1874 a grist mill was built on the bank of the Cowskin to process corn that was harvested in the area. Haysville's first school was built in 1876 at a location that may have been near what are now the Water Department facilities.  Haysville appears in Colton's New Sectional Map of the State of Kansas as early as 1879.

In 1887, the Chicago, Kansas and Nebraska Railway Company built a branch line north–south from Herington through Haysville to Caldwell. It was renamed in 1891 to Chicago, Rock Island and Pacific Railway which shut down in 1980, renamed in 1980 to Oklahoma, Kansas and Texas Railroad, merged in 1988 to Missouri Pacific Railroad, merged in 1997 to the current Union Pacific Railroad. Most locals still refer to this railroad as the "Rock Island". In 1903 a depot was opened and passenger trains shuttled people to and from Wichita.

On May 3, 1999, a tornado rated F4 on the Fujita scale struck Haysville, killing 4 people in Haysville. Damage to structures included 150 homes and 27 businesses. The tornado continued into Wichita causing damage to the South side of the city, killing an additional 2 people in Wichita. All of Haysville's historic district was destroyed. The only thing left standing on the east side of main was the original bank vault.

Geography
Haysville is located at  (37.563787, -97.353044).

Area Events
 Haysville Fall Festival.  The annual three-day event takes place in and around Riggs Park.  The Fall Festival celebrates its 30th year on October 17–19 in 2014.
 Village Christmas. Each year in the beginning of December. Celebrated in the Historic District of Haysville. Hot cocoa, carriage rides, choir performances, Santa, and more.
 Community Expo is held in April at the Haysville Community Library or Haysville Activity Center (HAC).
 Springnanigans is a festival for kids held in May in the Haysville Historic District.
 Fourth of July Celebration is held in Riggs Park. Fireworks show in the evening.

Demographics

Haysville is part of the Wichita, KS Metropolitan Statistical Area.

2010 census
As of the census of 2010, there were 10,826 people, 3,857 households, and 2,932 families living in the city. The racial makeup of the city was 92.7% White, 0.6% African American, 1.2% Native American, 0.9% Asian, 1.2% from other races, and 3.5% from two or more races. Hispanic or Latino of any race were 4.6% of the population.

There were 3,857 households, of which 44.0% had children under the age of 18 living with them, 56.0% were married couples living together, 13.9% had a female householder with no husband present, 6.2% had a male householder with no wife present, and 24.0% were non-families. 20.7% of all households were made up of individuals, and 9.8% had someone living alone who was 65 years of age or older. The average household size was 2.78 and the average family size was 3.20.

The median age in the city was 32.8 years. 30.4% of residents were under the age of 18; 8.8% were between the ages of 18 and 24; 26.9% were from 25 to 44; 21.7% were from 45 to 64; and 12.1% were 65 years of age or older. The gender makeup of the city was 48.0% male and 52.0% female.

2000 census
As of the census of 2000, there were 8,502 people, 3,021 households, and 2,350 families living in the city. The racial makeup of the city was 93.86% White, 0.53% African American, 1.14% Native American, 0.53% Asian, 0.01% Pacific Islander, 1.41% from other races, and 2.52% from two or more races. Hispanic or Latino of any race were 3.20% of the population.

There were 3,021 households, out of which 42.4% had children under the age of 18 living with them, 62.0% were married couples living together, 11.1% had a female householder with no husband present, and 22.2% were non-families. 19.1% of all households were made up of individuals, and 8.6% had someone living alone who was 65 years of age or older. The average household size was 2.78 and the average family size was 3.18.

In the city, the population was spread out, with 30.8% under the age of 18, 8.5% from 18 to 24, 28.8% from 25 to 44, 20.5% from 45 to 64, and 11.4% who were 65 years of age or older. The median age was 34 years. For every 100 females, there were 98.3 males. For every 100 females age 18 and over, there were 94.0 males.

The median income for a household in the city was $46,667, and the median income for a family was $50,118. Males had a median income of $37,626 versus $23,681 for females. The per capita income for the city was $18,484. About 2.9% of families and 4.4% of the population were below the poverty line, including 4.8% of those under age 18 and 7.5% of those age 65 or over.

Economics
Norland Plastics

Government
The Haysville government consists of a mayor and eight council members.  The council meets the 2nd Monday of each month at 7PM.
 City Hall, 200 W Grand.

Education 
The city of Haysville is served by Haysville USD 261.
 Campus High School, located in Wichita, but serves as the High School of Haysville, Kansas USD 261.
 Haysville High School (formerly Haysville Alternative High School) also serves Haysville teens
 Haysville Middle School
 Haysville West Middle School
 Freeman Elementary
 Nelson Elementary
 Oatville Elementary
 Prairie Elementary
 Rex Elementary
 Ruth Clark Elementary
 Tri-City Day School

See also
 April 26, 1991 tornado outbreak

References

Further reading

External links

 City of Haysville
 Haysville - Directory of Public Officials
 Haysville Fall Festival
 Haysville city map, KDOT

Cities in Kansas
Cities in Sedgwick County, Kansas
Wichita, KS Metropolitan Statistical Area
Populated places established in 1891
1891 establishments in Kansas